Lasteika (also: Λασταίικα Lastaiika) is a village and a community in the municipality of Pyrgos, Elis, Greece. It is situated at the foot of a low hill, 4 km northwest of the centre of Pyrgos. It is 2 km southwest of Agios Georgios, 2 km northeast of Vytinaiika, and 3 km southwest of Prasino, in the municipal unit Iardanos. The Greek National Road 9/E55 (Patras - Pyrgos) passes southwest of the village. The community consists of the villages Lasteika and Itia.

Historical population

See also
List of settlements in Elis

References

Populated places in Elis